The 2021–22 season is Ergotelis' 92nd season in existence and 15th overall in the second tier of the Greek football league system, and 3rd after the foundation of the Super League 2. The contents of this article cover club activities from 1 June 2021 until 30 May 2022.

Players

The following players have departed in mid-season 

Note: Flags indicate national team as has been defined under FIFA eligibility rules. Players and Managers may hold more than one non-FIFA nationality.

Transfers

In

Promoted from youth system

Re-signings

Out

Transfer summary
Undisclosed fees are not included in the transfer totals.

Expenditure

Summer:  €0,000

Winter:  €0,000

Total:  €0,000

Income

Summer:  €0,000

Winter:  €0,000

Total:  €0,000

Net totals

Summer:  €0,000

Winter:  €0,000

Total:  €0,000

Managerial changes

Kit
2021−22

|
|VariationsFriendlies

|

Preseason and friendlies

Preseason friendlies

Part A

17th Markomichelakis Tournament 

1. 45-minute friendly.

Part B

Competitions

Overview 

Last updated: 6 October 2021

Super League 2

Regular season

League table

Results summary

Results by Round

Matches 

a. Match postponed because of positive COVID-19 tests.

Greek Cup

Third round

Matches

Fourth round

Matches

Statistics

Squad statistics 

! colspan="9" style="background:#DCDCDC; text-align:center" | Goalkeepers
|-

! colspan="9" style="background:#DCDCDC; text-align:center" | Defenders
|-

! colspan="9" style="background:#DCDCDC; text-align:center" | Midfielders
|-

! colspan="9" style="background:#DCDCDC; text-align:center" | Forwards
|-

! colspan="9" style="background:#DCDCDC; text-align:center" | Players transferred/loaned out during the season
|-
|}

Goal scorers 

Last updated: 26 September 2021
Source: Competitive matches

Disciplinary record 

Last updated: 6 October 2021
Source: Competitive matches
 = Number of bookings;  = Number of sending offs after a second yellow card;  = Number of sending offs by a direct red card.

Injury record

References 

Ergotelis
Ergotelis F.C. seasons